Marshall may refer to:

Places

Australia
 Marshall, Victoria, a suburb of Geelong, Victoria

Canada
 Marshall, Saskatchewan
 The Marshall, a mountain in British Columbia

Liberia
 Marshall, Liberia

Marshall Islands
 Marshall Islands, an island nation in the Pacific Ocean

United States of America
 Marshall, Alaska
 Marshall, Arkansas
 Marshall, California
 Lotus, California, former name Marshall
 Marshall Pass, a mountain pass in Colorado
 Marshall, Illinois
 Marshall, Indiana
 Marshall, Michigan
 Marshall, Minnesota
 Marshall, Missouri
 Marshall, New York
 Marshall, North Carolina
 Marshall, North Dakota
 Marshall, Oklahoma
 Marshall, Texas, the largest U.S. city named Marshall
 Marshall, Virginia
 Marshall, Wisconsin (disambiguation)
 Marshall, Dane County, Wisconsin
 Marshall, Richland County, Wisconsin
 Marshall, Rusk County, Wisconsin

Businesses
 Marshall of Cambridge, a British holding company encompassing aerospace, fleet management, property
 Marshall Aerospace and Defence Group, a British aerospace company
 Marshall Amplification, a British music equipment manufacturer
 Marshall Bus, a former British bus manufacturer
 Marshall Pottery, an American producer of red-clay pottery
 Marshall, Sons & Co., a former British agricultural machinery manufacturer

Education and government
 Marshall College (disambiguation)
 Marshall Space Flight Center, in Huntsville, Alabama, US
 Marshall University, in Huntington, West Virginia, US
 USC Marshall School of Business, at the University of Southern California, US

Other uses
 Marshall Law, 2002 Australian television series
 Marshall Sandstone, a geologic formation in Michigan
 Marshall (name), a surname and given name, including a list of people with the name
 Marshall (film), a 2017 biographical film about Thurgood Marshall
 USS Marshall, the name of several ships of the US Navy 
 "Marshall" by Tlot Tlot, a 1991 version of the song "Under the Water"

See also
 
 
 Marshal (disambiguation)
 Marshalling (disambiguation)
 Marshalls (disambiguation)
 Marshall County (disambiguation)
 Marshall Township (disambiguation)
 Justice Marshall (disambiguation)
 Martial
 Marshall Plan, a 1948 American initiative for foreign aid to Western Europe
 Marshall Scholarship, for American students in the UK
 We Are Marshall, a 2006 American documentary film